The Republic of Vietnam competed as Vietnam in the 1956 Summer Olympics in Melbourne, Australia. Six competitors, all men, took part in four events in one sport.

Cycling

Sprint
Le Van Phuoc — 16th place

Time trial
Nguyen Van Nhieu — 1:23.6 (→ 22nd place)

Individual road race
Ngô Thành Liêm — did not finish (→ no ranking)
Nguyen Hw Thoa — did not finish (→ no ranking)
Tran Gia Thu — did not finish (→ no ranking)
Trung Trung Lê — did not finish (→ no ranking)

References

External links
Official Olympic Reports

Nations at the 1956 Summer Olympics
1956
1956 in South Vietnam